Collington is a village and civil parish  north east of Hereford, in the county of Herefordshire, England. In 2001 the parish had a population of 61. The parish touches Edvin Loach and Saltmarshe, Edwyn Ralph, Stoke Bliss, Tedstone Wafer, Thornbury and Wolferlow. Collington shares a parish council with Edwyn Ralph and Thornbury called "Thornbury Group Parish Council".

Landmarks 
There are 7 listed buildings in Collington. Collington has a church called St Mary.

History 
The name "Collington" means 'Farm/settlement connected with Cola/Col'. Collington was recorded in the Domesday Book as Col(l)intune. On 24 March 1884 Combe's Wood Houses (which had 1 house in 1891) was transferred from the parish of Edvin Loach to the parish.

References 

 

Villages in Herefordshire
Civil parishes in Herefordshire